The Ramberg–Bäcklund reaction is an organic reaction converting an α-halo sulfone into an alkene in presence of a base with extrusion of sulfur dioxide. The reaction is named after the two Swedish chemists Ludwig Ramberg and Birger Bäcklund. The carbanion formed by deprotonation gives an unstable episulfone that decomposes with elimination of sulfur dioxide. This elimination step is considered to be a concerted cycloelimination.

The overall transformation is the conversion of the carbon–sulfur bonds to a carbon–carbon double bond. The original procedure involved halogenation of a sulfide, followed by oxidation to the sulfone. Recently, the preferred method has reversed the order of the steps. After the oxidation, which is normally done with a peroxy acid, halogenation is done under basic conditions by use of dibromodifluoromethane for the halogen transfer step.  This method was used to synthesize 1,8-diphenyl-1,3,5,7-octatetraene.

The Ramberg–Bäcklund reaction has several applications. Due to the nature of elimination, it can be applied to both small rings ,

and large rings containing a double bond .

The necessary α-halo sulfones are accessible through oxidation of the corresponding α-halo sulfides with peracids such as meta-chloroperbenzoic acid; oxidation of sulfides takes place selectively in the presence of alkenes and alcohols. α-Halo sulfides may in turn be synthesized through the treatment of sulfides with halogen electrophiles such as N-chlorosuccinimide or N-bromosuccinimide.

The sulfone group contains an acidic proton in one of the α-positions which is abstracted by a strong base (scheme 1). The negative charge placed on this position (formally a carbanion) is transferred to the halogen residing on the other α-position in a nucleophilic displacement temporarily forming a three-membered cyclic sulfone. This intermediate is unstable and releases sulfur dioxide to form the alkene. Mixtures of cis isomer and trans isomer are usually obtained.

This reaction type gives access to 1,2-dimethylenecyclohexane

and the epoxide variation  access to allyl alcohols.

The Favorskii rearrangement and the Eschenmoser sulfide contraction are conceptually related reactions.

A recently developed application of the Ramberg–Bäcklund reaction is the synthesis of C-glycosides. The required thioethers can be prepared easily by exchange with a thiol. The application of the Ramberg–Bäcklund conditions then leads to an exocyclic vinyl ether that can be reduced to the C-nucleoside .

References
  
 
 
 
  
  
  
  
  

Elimination reactions
Olefination reactions
Carbon-carbon bond forming reactions
Name reactions